XHON-FM (branded as Classic) is a Mexican Spanish-language FM radio station that serves the Tampico, Tamaulipas market area. It broadcasts mainly classic and modern music in English.

History
XHON received its concession on July 11, 1980. It was owned by Víctor Flores Meza. In 2016 the Flores family transferred operation of its stations to Multimedios Radio, who converted them to its own formats. XHON was given the Classic format (though with a slight change in name). Multimedios bought XHON outright, with the concession itself transferred from Formula Flores, S.A. de C.V., to Multimedios Radio, S.A. de C.V. in 2017. At the same time, the station started broadcasting 24 hours a day. In April 2018, XHON's transmitter was moved to the Multimedios FM and TV tower in Tampico.

References

Radio stations in Tampico
Multimedios Radio